Goran Trivan (born 1962) is a Serbian politician. He served as the Minister of Environmental Protection since 29 June 2017 until October 2020. He is a member of the Socialist Party of Serbia since its foundation.

He also served as the Minister of Youth and Sports in 1991, in the first convocation of the Government of Serbia.

Education and career
Trivan was born in Kladovo, SFR Yugoslavia in 1962, where he finished primary and secondary school. He graduated from the University of Belgrade Faculty of Forestry. Being a member of Socialist Party of Serbia, he served as the Minister of Youth and Sports in the first convocation of the Government of Serbia, from 11 February until 31 July 1991.

Later he worked in national forestry company Srbijašume, where he later became executive director. Being a prominent ruling party member, he has served as the president and member of Steering committee of numerous national institutions in various fields.

In November 2001, year after the overthrow of Slobodan Milošević, he was arrested for the suspicion of committing the criminal act of incitement, which damaged Kladovo-based youth camp for 6.5 million dinars. He was later acquitted due to absolute obsolescence.

He was the head of Belgrade Secretariat for Environmental Protection from 2008 to 2017.

2017–2020: Minister of Environmental Protection
On 29 June 2017, he was named the Minister of Environmental Protection of Serbia in the cabinet of Ana Brnabić.

In August 2017, Trivan has stated that Serbia, which significantly lags behind other European countries in the environmental protection, needs 15 billion euros of investments to put in order the field of environment. He has also stated that his ministry will emphasize on projects (thus way generating more money from EU funds and foreign investments), better management of landfills and control of harmful gases and excretories. In late August 2017, Trivan stated that it is primarily necessary to invest around 5 billion euros in wastewater treatment plants. He has also criticized the sales of water sources in the past decade to foreign companies, saying that we are yet to see long-term incomprehensible consequences of such actions.

References

External links

1962 births
Living people
People from Kladovo
Government ministers of Serbia